Vitis shuttleworthii is a North American liana (woody vine) in the grape family commonly known as the calloose grape or bear grape (alternatively referred as calusa grape). The name refers to the group of Native American people that resided in southwest FL, the Calusa. It is native to south and central Florida, with isolated populations in southern Alabama.

The species was first described in 1887 using the name Vitis coriacea. However, this name had already been used for an Asian plant, so it was necessary to coin another name of the American species, now called V. shuttleworthii.

Gallery

References

External links
Plants of the World Online: Vitis shuttleworthii
Atlas of Florida Vascular Plants: Vitis shuttleworthii
Flora of North America: Vitis shuttleworthii
Institute for Regional Conservation, Floristic Inventory of South Florida: Vitis shuttleworthii
Global Biodiversity Information Facility: Vitis shuttleworthii
International Plant Names Index: Vitis shuttleworthii
United States Department of Agriculture - Natural Resources Conservation Service - Plant Database: Vitis shuttleworthii
Native American Ethnobotany: Vitis shuttleworthii
Vitis shuttleworthii (Bear Grape)
Tropicos: Vitis shuttleworthii
The Plant List: Vitis shuttleworthii
Eat the Weeds and Other Things Too, Grapes of Path
Dave's Garden: Vitis shuttleworthii

shuttleworthii
Endemic flora of the United States
Flora of the United States
Flora of the Southeastern United States
Flora of Florida
Flora of Alabama
Dioecious plants
Vines
Fruits originating in North America
Plants used in Native American cuisine
Plants described in 1887